Mazakote Mixtape: Gold Edition Vol. 1 or simply Mazakote Mixtape is the fourth studio album released by Puerto Rican Reggaeton artist Speedy.

Track listing 
Intro
Guillate Cabron
Mueve Ese Booty Pa Tra
Pa Lante y Pa Tra (feat. J-King & Maximan, DJ Blass)
La Cancion De Los HP
Esta Noche
Mi Gata
El Mundo Del Sexo (Alex & Gaby track)
Pegate (feat. Cholo The Black)
Ven Donde Mi
Poco A Poco
Pa Perrial
Oye Hola (feat. El Bory)
Mulata (Alex & Gaby track)
Mil y Una Historia
Vamos Alla (feat. Blade Pacino & Great Kilo)
Outro

2008 mixtape albums
Speedy (musician) albums